Losing to Win is a 1911 American silent film produced by Kalem Company. It was directed by Sidney Olcott with Gene Gauntier and Jack J. Clark in the leading roles.

Cast
 Gene Gauntier - Diana Grant
 Jack J. Clark - Jack Carlyle

Production notes
The film was shot on board RMS Baltic and in New York and Ireland during summer 1911.

References
 Michel Derrien, Aux origines du cinéma irlandais: Sidney Olcott, le premier oeil, TIR 2013.  
 The Moving Picture World, Vol 9, p 683 and p 911. 
 The New York Dramatic Mirror, March 27, 1911. 
 Supplement to The Bioscope, November 9, 1911, p XXI.

External links

 Losing to Win website dedicated to Sidney Olcott

1911 films
Silent American drama films
American silent short films
Films shot in Ireland
Films directed by Sidney Olcott
1911 short films
1911 drama films
American black-and-white films
1910s American films
1910s English-language films
American drama short films